The 1954 New Mexico A&M Aggies football team was an American football team that represented New Mexico College of Agriculture and Mechanical Arts (now known as New Mexico State University) as a member of the Border Conference during the 1954 college football season.  In their second year under head coach James Patton, the Aggies compiled a 0–9 record (0–4 against conference opponents), finished last in the conference, and were outscored by a total of 306 to 87. The team played its home games at Memorial Stadium.

Schedule

References

New Mexico AandM
New Mexico State Aggies football seasons
College football winless seasons
New Mexico AandM Aggies football